Kittisford is a village and former parish and manor in Somerset, England, situated  west of Taunton in the Taunton Deane district. It is now within the parish of Stawley.

The parish Church of St Nicholas was built around 1500 altered in the mid 17th century and was restored in 1875. It is a Grade II* listed building dedicated to St Nicholas. In the church survives a monumental brass to Richard Bluett (d.1524) and his wife Agnes Verney.

Gerald Gardiner took the title "Baron Gardiner of Kittisford" when he was made a life peer.

Historic estates
The Manor of Kittisford, of which the manor house is known as Kittisford Barton. The building was constructed in the late 15th or early 16th century.

References

Villages in Taunton Deane